= Nutrition and Metabolic Insights =

- Discipline: Nutrition
- Language: English

Publication details
- Publisher: Sage
- Open access: Yes

Standard abbreviations
- ISO 4: Nutr. Metab. Insights

Nutrition and Metabolic Insights is an open access and peer-reviewed scientific journal. It was established in 2008 and is published by Sage. It is indexed by ESCI, DOAJ, EBSCO, ProQuest, and PubMed Central (PMC).
